Glenmont is the name of some places in North America:
United States
Glenmont, Maryland
Glenmont (Washington Metro), the Washington Metro station that serves the aforementioned suburb
Glenmont, New York
Glenmont, Ohio
Glenmont (house), the home of inventor Thomas Edison, in Llewellyn Park in West Orange, New Jersey

Canada
Glenmont, Nova Scotia